The 1960 MLB expansion draft was held by Major League Baseball on December 14, 1960, to fill the rosters of the Los Angeles Angels and the Washington Senators. The Angels and Senators (who later became the Texas Rangers) were new franchises that would enter the American League (AL) the following season as part of the 1961 Major League Baseball expansion. The Angels represented the AL's first team to be based on the West Coast of the United States, while the Senators would take the place of the league's original Washington Senators franchise that had moved to Minneapolis–Saint Paul as the Minnesota Twins after the  season.

Ground rules
Each existing American League club had to make available for the draft seven players on their active rosters on August 31, 1960, and eight others from their 40-man rosters. The expansion clubs paid US$75,000 for each of 28 players they drafted with a maximum of seven players drafted from each existing club, not including minor league selections. They were required to take at least ten pitchers, two catchers, six infielders, and four outfielders. The clubs also had the option of drafting one non-roster player for $25,000 from each established franchise.

Hasty expansion sowed draft confusion
Reacting belatedly to the National League's July 1960 announcement that it would expand to New York and Houston to begin play in April 1962 (twenty months later), the American League suddenly declared in October 1960 it would add two new teams as well—and that the AL's expansion teams would take the field in only six months, in time for the 1961 season.

Playing catch-up to the National League, under a much tighter deadline with no ownership groups, management or stadia yet in place, the Junior Circuit was forced to wait until November 17, 1960, to officially award an expansion franchise to Washington, D.C., to replace the recently-relocated Twins. Because it also intended to enter the Los Angeles metropolitan market, then controlled by Walter O'Malley, principal owner of the Dodgers, the American League was compelled to negotiate an indemnification agreement with O'Malley before the Los Angeles franchise could be granted. Finally, on December 6, 1960—barely a week before the expansion draft was scheduled to be held at AL headquarters in Boston—the Angels franchise was officially created and awarded to Gene Autry. The league's chaotic, eleventh-hour approach to expansion resulted, on the day of the draft, in the new Senators' and Angels' noncompliance with rules that governed the maximum number of players each new club could select from each of the eight established teams. As a result, several post-draft trades were necessary to rectify the problem.

The situation is described by authors Andy McCue and Eric Thompson in their 2011 Hardball Times article, "Mismanagement 101: The American League Expansion of 1961," also published by the Society for American Baseball Research.

Results

References

External links

Major League Baseball expansion drafts
Expansion Draft
Los Angeles Angels
Texas Rangers (baseball)
Continental League
Major League Baseball expansion draft